Juha Hirvi (born 25 March 1960 in Kymi) is a Finnish sport shooter. He won the silver medal in men's 50 metre rifle three positions at the 2000 Summer Olympics. He has also won two silver medals in ISSF World Shooting Championships. He was the flag-bearer for Finland at the 2008 Beijing Summer Olympics opening ceremony.

Juha Hirvi made Finnish Olympic history in 2008 when he participated in his sixth Olympic Games, which is a record among Finnish athletes. He holds the record with other 2008 participant, dressage rider Kyra Kyrklund and three winter Olympians: cross country skiers Marja-Liisa Kirvesniemi and Harri Kirvesniemi and ice hockey player Raimo Helminen. Juha Hirvi's manager is Finnish Sport Management Agency SportElite.

See also
 List of athletes with the most appearances at Olympic Games

External links
 Athlete bio at the official site of 2008 Olympics
 Juha Hirvi at SportElite's website

References

1960 births
Finnish male sport shooters
ISSF rifle shooters
Olympic shooters of Finland
Shooters at the 1988 Summer Olympics
Shooters at the 1992 Summer Olympics
Shooters at the 1996 Summer Olympics
Shooters at the 2000 Summer Olympics
Shooters at the 2004 Summer Olympics
Shooters at the 2008 Summer Olympics
Olympic silver medalists for Finland
Living people
Olympic medalists in shooting
Medalists at the 2000 Summer Olympics